Nitrariaceae is a family of flowering plants in the order Sapindales. It comprises four genera, Malacocarpus, Nitraria, Peganum and Tetradiclis, totalling 19 species.

The family's main range is in the arid and semi-arid regions from Central Asia west to North Africa and southern Europe, but there are also species in eastern Mexico and southern Australia.

References

 
Sapindales families